The Instinct is the second studio album by Denali, released in 2003. It is their final album, as the band broke up the following year.

Track listing
"Hold Your Breath"
"Surface"
"Run Through"
"The Instinct"
"Do Something"
"Real Heat"
"Nullaby"
"Normal Days"
"Welcome"

Personnel 
 Maura Davis: vocals, guitars, keyboards, piano, vibraphone
 Keeley Davis: bass, baritone, synth, samples
 Cam DiNunzio: guitars, piano, melodica, programmed synth, noises
 Johnathan Fuller: drums, percussion, sequencer, samples

References 

2003 albums
Denali (band) albums
Jade Tree (record label) albums